The 1980 Dutch Open was a Grand Prix tennis tournament staged in Hilversum, Netherlands. The tournament was played on outdoor clay courts and was held from 21 July until 27 July 1980. It was the 24th edition of the tournament. Balázs Taróczy won his third consecutive singles title at the event and fourth in total.

Finals

Singles
 Balázs Taróczy defeated  Haroon Ismail 6–3, 6–2, 6–1

Doubles
 Tom Okker /  Balázs Taróczy defeated  Tony Giammalva /  Buster Mottram 7–5, 6–3, 7–6

References

External links
 ITF tournament edition details

Dutch Open (tennis)
Dutch Open (tennis)
Dutch Open
Dutch Open
Dutch Open (tennis), 1980